Civic Center–Vista (previously known as Escondido Avenue and Civic Center Drive) is a station in Vista, California that is served by North County Transit District's SPRINTER light rail line. The station is located at 810 Phillips Street.

Although the Sprinter began service in March 2008, the eastbound platform of the station remained closed for several months due to construction to improve its platform. It finally opened in September of the same year.

The street Escondido Avenue was renamed Civic Center Drive in 2010 in light of the construction of a large city hall complex, and the station's name was changed to reflect this. The station was again renamed Civic Center–Vista to differentiate it from the San Marcos Civic Center station.

Platforms and tracks

References

External links

SPRINTER Stations

North County Transit District stations
Railway stations in the United States opened in 2008
2008 establishments in California